Cotoneaster apiculatus, the cranberry cotoneaster, is a species of flowering plant in the family Rosaceae. It is native to central China, and it has been introduced to various locales in Europe and the United States. It is good on streambanks and slopes where erosion control is desired, as its branches will grow roots where they touch soil.

References

apiculatus
Endemic flora of China
Flora of North-Central China
Flora of South-Central China
Plants described in 1912